Richard Swann Swann-Mason  (4 March 1871 – 21 February 1942) was an English first-class cricketer and clergyman.

Swann-Mason was born in March 1871 at Haslingfield, Cambridgeshire. He was educated at The Perse School, before graduating as a non-collegiate graduate from the University of Cambridge. After graduating, he became a clergyman in the Anglican Church. He played minor counties cricket for Cambridgeshire from 1896–1908, making 41 appearances in the Minor Counties Championship. He also played first-class cricket for the Marylebone Cricket Club (MCC), debuting in 1909 against Leicestershire at Lord's. Swann-Mason made two further first-class appearances for the MCC, against Leicestershire in 1910, and Cambridge University in 1914. He scored 67 runs in his three first-class matches, with a high score of 25.

For his services during the war, he was made an OBE in the 1919 New Year Honours. Following the war, he served as the vicar of Christ Church, Albany Street until his death at St Pancras in February 1942.

References

External links

1871 births
1942 deaths
People from South Cambridgeshire District
People educated at The Perse School
Alumni of the University of Cambridge
19th-century English Anglican priests
English cricketers
Cambridgeshire cricketers
20th-century English Anglican priests
Marylebone Cricket Club cricketers
Royal Navy chaplains
Royal Navy personnel of World War I
Members of the Order of the British Empire